Donald's Camera is a 1941 American Donald Duck short film directed by Dick Lundy and produced by Walt Disney.

Plot
Donald decides to bring his camera to "hunt" some wildlife. He encounters several, including a woodpecker, who quickly torment him and make his efforts to photograph them difficult.

Voice cast
 Clarence Nash as Donald Duck

Home media
The short was released on May 18, 2004, on Walt Disney Treasures: The Chronological Donald, Volume One: 1934-1941.

References

External links 
 

Donald Duck short films
Films produced by Walt Disney
1940s Disney animated short films
1941 animated films
1941 films